Revolution Pipeline is a  long 24-inch natural gas pipeline, carrying natural gas between two processing facilities and traversing Allegheny County, Beaver County, Butler County, and Washington County in Pennsylvania. It is owned and operated by Energy Transfer Partners. 

On September 10, 2018, a landslide caused by the construction of the pipeline caused an explosion, resulting in on the largest civil penalties issued by the Pennsylvania state Department of Environmental Protection (DEP) against Energy Transfer Partners.

See also
 List of natural gas pipelines

References

Natural gas pipelines in the United States
Natural gas pipelines in Pennsylvania